John Cornelius Fordyce (1735–1809) was Member of Parliament for New Romney from 1796 to 1802, and for Berwick-Upon-Tweed from 1802 to 5 April 1803.

He was the son of Thomas Fordyce of Ayton, an Edinburgh lawyer and Elizabeth Whitefoord, daughter of Adam Whitefoord, 1st Baronet. Fordyce became a banker and by the age of 24 was a Director of the Royal Bank. His own bank, Fordyce, Malcolm and Co., collapsed in 1772.

He entered Parliament in 1796, sitting for New Romney until 1802 and then Berwick-Upon-Tweed until 1803.

He married Catharine, the daughter of Sir William Maxwell, 3rd Baronet of Monreith, Wigtown, and with her had at least two sons and four daughters. One of their daughters, Magdalen, married William Blair, who went on to become the MP for Ayrshire.

References 

1735 births
1809 deaths
Scottish bankers
Scottish politicians
Members of the Parliament of Great Britain for English constituencies
British MPs 1796–1800
Members of the Parliament of the United Kingdom for English constituencies
UK MPs 1801–1802
UK MPs 1802–1806